Tomp-e Rigan (also Romanized as Tomp-e Rīgān; also known as Tokhm-e Rīgān) is a village in Howmeh Rural District, in the Central District of Iranshahr County, Sistan and Baluchestan Province, Iran. At the 2006 census, its population was 543, in 105 families.

References 

Populated places in Iranshahr County